The Producers Guild Film Award for Best Debut Director (previously known as the Apsara Award for Best Debut Director) is given by the producers of the film and television guild as part of its annual award ceremony for Hindi films, to recognise the work of new directors. Following its inception in 2004, no one was awarded in 2005 and from 2007-09.

Winners

2000s

 2004Chandraprakash Dwivedi – Pinjar, Nikhil Advani – Kal Ho Naa Ho and Rajkumar Hirani – Munna Bhai M.B.B.S.
 2005 No award
 2006Pradeep Sarkar – Parineeta
 2007 No award
 2008 No award
 2009 No award

2010s

 2010Ayan Mukerji – Wake Up Sid 2011Maneesh Sharma – Band Baaja Baaraat 2012 No award
 2013Gauri Shinde – English Vinglish 2014Ritesh Batra – The Lunchbox 2015Omung Kumar – Mary Kom  Abhishek Varman - 2 States  Shashank Khaitan - Humpty Sharma Ki Dulhania  Nitin Kakkar - Filmistaan'''
2016 Neeraj Ghaywan - Masaan

See also
Producers Guild Film Awards
Producers Guild Film Award for Best Male Debut
Producers Guild Film Award for Best Female Debut

References

Producers Guild Film Awards
Directorial debut film awards